In mathematics, a left (or right) quaternionic vector space is a left (or right) H-module where H is the (non-commutative) division ring of quaternions.

The space Hn of n-tuples of quaternions is both a left and right H-module using the componentwise left and right multiplication:

for quaternions q and q1, q2, ... qn.

Since H is a division algebra, every finitely generated (left or right) H-module has a basis, and hence is isomorphic to Hn for some n.

See also
 Vector space 
 General linear group 
 Special linear group 
 SL(n,H) 
 Symplectic group

References

Quaternions
Linear algebra